is a Japanese politician.

Life and career 
Born in Musashino, Tokyo, Japan. Her father was a Sankei Shimbun newspaper reporter. She spent her childhood in Fukui city, where her wealthy family ran the geisha ryokan Beniya at Awara Onsen. Later her father was defeated in the general election, and, heavily in debt, the Yamatani family left Fukui for Tokyo. She graduated from the University of the Sacred Heart (a Catholic university in Tokyo) with the Bachelor of Letters degree in March 1973. She worked in the United States for a publishing company. She became the editor-in-chief of Sankei Living Shimbun in 1985 and became known as an essayist and television personality.

In 1989  Yamatani ran for a seat in the House of Councillors as a Democratic Socialist Party candidate, but was defeated.

In June 2000, she was elected to the Diet of Japan on the Democratic Party ticket as a proportional representative. She left the party in 2002 to join the New Conservative Party. Though she had planned to run for the seat representing the Tokyo 3rd district in 2003, the emergence of Hirotaka Ishihara, son of Governor Shintaro Ishihara, forced her to run from the 4th district, where she was defeated. She then returned to the Diet as a proportional representative of the Liberal Democratic Party in 2004.

Yamatani is a vocal opponent of "gender-free education" and of sex education in home economics textbooks and other parts of the school curriculum.

Affiliated to the openly revisionist organization Nippon Kaigi, she is also a supporter of Japan's territorial claims and has called for special legislation to restrict land sales to foreigners on Tsushima Island and to implement measures to boost its local economy without having to depend heavily on South Korean tourists.  Koreans own about 0.007 percent of the land on Tsushima.

Yamatani has also made anti-LGBT statements, ridiculing the rights of transgender persons from using the bathroom of their chosen gender and lamenting situations where transgender athletes are stealing medals from cisgender athletes.

References

External links 
 "Eriko Yamatani's Lecture on June 14, 2005 at Mitaka Marketing Plaza"  reported by CGS, International Christian University

1950 births
Living people
People from Fukui Prefecture
People from Musashino, Tokyo
Japanese expatriates in the United States
Japanese journalists
Japanese essayists
Japanese television personalities
Female members of the House of Representatives (Japan)
Members of the House of Representatives (Japan)
Female members of the House of Councillors (Japan)
Members of the House of Councillors (Japan)
North Korean abductions of Japanese citizens
Female critics of feminism
Japanese anti-communists
Japanese Roman Catholics
Democratic Socialist Party (Japan) politicians
Democratic Party of Japan politicians
Members of Nippon Kaigi
New Conservative Party (Japan) politicians
Liberal Democratic Party (Japan) politicians
University of the Sacred Heart (Japan) alumni
21st-century Japanese politicians
21st-century Japanese women politicians